The Blue Ribbon Open was a professional golf tournament on the PGA Tour, played only in 1951. It was held in Wisconsin at the North Hills Country Club in Menomenee Falls, northwest of Milwaukee.

Part-time Hollywood actor Joe Kirkwood Jr. won the event at 271 (–13), two shots over runners-up Sam Snead and Jim Ferrier, the  leader. The purse was $20,000 with a winner's share of $2,750. Kirkwood equaled the course record in the final round with a seven-under 64. He had won on tour three years earlier at the Philadelphia Inquirer Open. Following the win, Kirkwood left to go fishing in northern Wisconsin.

North Hills was the site of the Milwaukee Open in 1940 and later hosted the Milwaukee Open Invitational in 1960 and 1961.

Leaderboard
Sunday, July 22, 1951
 
Source:

See also
Other former PGA Tour events in Milwaukee
Milwaukee Open, 1940
Milwaukee Open Invitational, 1955–61
Greater Milwaukee Open, 1968–2009

References

External links
North Hills Country Club

Former PGA Tour events
Golf in Wisconsin
Sports in Milwaukee
1951 establishments in Wisconsin
1951 disestablishments in Wisconsin